The 1983 1000 km of Nürburgring was an endurance race held at the Nürburgring Nordschleife. It was Round 3 of the 1983 FIA World Endurance Championship. The race was the last international race to be held at the Nordschleife until the 2015 FIA WTCC Race of Germany, and the following year, the new GP-Strecke track was completed and all international racing was held on that section of the track.  It was also the race where West German driver Stefan Bellof recorded a then-record 6:11.13 around the track in his factory backed Rothmans Porsche 956, which was unofficially beaten in 2018.

Official results

Notes
 Pole position: #2 Rothmans Porsche (Stefan Bellof) - 6:11:13
 Fastest lap: #2 Rothmans Porsche (Stefan Bellof) - 6:25:91

References

6 Hours of Nürburgring
Nuerburgring
Nurburgring
Nurburgring